The Vice Regent Stakes is a thoroughbred horse race run annually since 1997 at the end of August at Woodbine Racetrack in Toronto, Ontario, Canada.

An Ontario Sire Stakes, it is a restricted race for three-year-olds raced over a distance of one mile (8 furlongs) on Turf and currently carries a purse of $95,200.

The race was named to honor Vice Regent, the important Canadian Horse Racing Hall of Fame sire. Vice Regent's son Randy Regent, won the inaugural running in 1997 in record time that stood until 2008.

Records
Speed  record: 
 1:33.76  - Sand Cove (2008)

Most wins by an owner:
 2 - RMC Stable (2001, 2005)
 2 - Paul Buttigieg (2010, 2014)

Most wins by a jockey:
 2 - Na Somsanith (1999, 2001)
 2 - Ray Sabourin (2002, 2004)
 2 - Emile Ramsammy (2003, 2005)

Most wins by a trainer:
 2 - Paul Buttigieg (2010, 2014)

Winners

References
  Woodbine Entertainment Group
   The Vice Regent Stakes at Pedigree query

Ontario Sire Stakes
Ungraded stakes races in Canada
Flat horse races for three-year-olds
Recurring sporting events established in 1997
Woodbine Racetrack